The 1979 Preakness Stakes was the 104th running of the $235,000 Grade 1 Preakness Stakes thoroughbred horse race. The race took place on May 19, 1979, and was televised in the United States on the ABC television network. Spectacular Bid, who was jockeyed by Ronnie Franklin, won the race by six and one half lengths over runner-up Golden Act. Approximate post time was 5:41 p.m. Eastern Time. The race was run on a track listed as good in a final time of 1:54-1/5.  The Maryland Jockey Club reported total attendance of 72,607, this is recorded as second highest on the list of American thoroughbred racing top attended events for North America in 1979.

Payout 

The 104th Preakness Stakes Payout Schedule

$2 Exacta:  (2–3) paid   $15.80

The full chart 

 Winning Breeder: Gilmore & Jason Mimes; (KY)
 Winning Time: 1:54 1/5
 Track Condition: Good
 Total Attendance: 72,607

References

External links 

 

1979
1979 in horse racing
Horse races in Maryland
1979 in American sports
1979 in sports in Maryland